Seiichirō, Seiichiro, Seiichirou or Seiichiroh (written: 誠一郎, 清一朗 or 征一郎) is a masculine Japanese given name. Notable people with the name include:

, Japanese tennis player
, Japanese footballer
, Japanese footballer
, Japanese politician
, Japanese cyclist
, Japanese footballer
, Japanese long distance runner
, Japanese politician
, Japanese physician
, Japanese politician.

Japanese masculine given names